Nealy Gordon Farm is a historic home and farm located at Brush Harbor, Montgomery County, Virginia.  The farmhouse was built in three sections beginning in the post-American Civil War era and ending in about 1920.  It is a small two-story saddlebag farmhouse, that started as a nearly square log single-pen dwelling of two stories. Also on the property are the contributing frame meathouse, privy, spring house with lattice-enclosed forebay, hog shed, two large barns, and corn crib.

It was listed on the National Register of Historic Places in 1989.

References

Houses on the National Register of Historic Places in Virginia
Farms on the National Register of Historic Places in Virginia
Houses in Montgomery County, Virginia
National Register of Historic Places in Montgomery County, Virginia